Pluit Village is a shopping center located on Jl. Pluit Indah Raya, Pluit, Penjaringan, North Jakarta, Indonesia.

Then in 2008, PT. Lippo Karawaci Tbk entered as a new manager and this mall was renamed Pluit Village. Some of the famous tenants in this mall include Matahari department Store, Carrefour, Best Denki, Timezone, Amazone, Playtopia,Cinépolis, Anytime Fitness, and MR. DIY.

The Mall is located on Jl. Pluit Indah Raya and has a strategic location as it is close to arterial road and toll gate. Pluit Village has a large parking area that can accommodate 2300 cars and 2150 motorcycles.

See also

List of shopping malls in Indonesia

External links

References

Shopping malls in Jakarta
Post-independence architecture of Indonesia
North Jakarta